The Immortal Hour is a 1899 play by Scottish playwright Fiona Macleod, a pseudonym of writer William Sharp.

Dalua
Dalua is a character in the play. Although the play uses characters and settings from Celtic mythology, the character of Dalua was the invention of Macleod. He is a brooding and fateful presence, known alternatively as the Amadan-Dhu, the Dark One, the Faery Fool. He claims to be even more ancient than the gods. It is through his movements and gestures that he affects the feelings and desires of the other characters and thus drives the fatal, hubristic pursuit of the Faery princess Etain by the mortal king Eochaidh; later, at the end of the work, he steps in and touches the king, who consequently dies.

Opera
The English composer Rutland Boughton composed an opera of the same name with a libretto adapted from the play.

References

Scottish plays
1899 plays
Plays set in Scotland

External links 

 The Immortal Hour on the Internet Archive (The Writings of 'Fiona Macleod' vol. 7, p. 316)